The Roman Catholic Diocese of Ituiutaba is a diocese located in the city of Ituiutaba in the Ecclesiastical province of Uberaba in Brazil.

History
 16 October 1982: Established as Diocese of Ituiutaba from the Metropolitan Archdiocese of Uberaba and Diocese of Uberlândia

Bishops
 Bishops of Ituiutaba (Roman rite)
 Bishop Aloísio Roque Oppermann, S.C.J.  (1983.01.22 – 1988.11.09), appointed Coadjutor Bishop of Campanha, Minas Gerais; future Archbishop
 Bishop Paulo Sérgio Machado (1989.09.24 – 2006.11.22), appointed	Bishop of São Carlos, São Paulo 
 Bishop Francisco Carlos da Silva (2007.09.19 – 2015.09.30), appointed Bishop of Lins, São Paulo
 Bishop Irineu Andreassa, O.F.M. (2016.11.30 - present)

Other priest of this diocese who became bishop
João Gilberto de Moura, appointed Bishop of Jardim, Mato Grosso do Sul in 2013

References

 GCatholic.org
 Catholic Hierarchy

Roman Catholic dioceses in Brazil
Christian organizations established in 1982
Ituiutaba, Roman Catholic Diocese of
Roman Catholic dioceses and prelatures established in the 20th century
1982 establishments in Brazil